The following is a list of notable past players of the Los Angeles Rams, formerly the St. Louis Rams and the Cleveland Rams.

Notable alumni

Current players

First-round draft picks

Super Bowl XXXIV Championship Roster

Further reading
Smith, Mike (Ed), (2000). Eleven Men Believed. Sagamore Publishing. 

Players
Los Angeles Rams